Listen to the Banned is a compilation album that features the music of banned, censored and imprisoned artists from the Middle East, Africa and Asia.
The album is the result of a two-year collaboration between the Norwegian artist Deeyah Khan and international organisation . As well as receiving critical acclaim, Listen to the Banned album has peaked at number 6 on the World Music Charts Europe and spent months on these charts. The album was released worldwide in 2010

Together with Freemuse, Deeyah's' aim with Listen to the Banned is to help give a voice to the voiceless and to promote freedom of creative and musical expression and to promote the work of Freemuse. 
The album is supported by Amnesty International UK.

Freemuse & Deeyah present Listen to the Banned is the first album release in what is planned to be a long term series of Listen to the Banned compilation albums.

Track listing

References

External links
 Official Listen to the Banned website
 Freemuse website
 Valley Entertainment (Western Release)
 Grappa-Heilo (European Release)

2010 compilation albums
Valley Entertainment compilation albums
Arabic music
World music compilation albums
Arabic-language compilation albums
Grappa Music compilation albums